The fifth season of Nip/Tuck premiered on October 30, 2007 and concluded on March 3, 2009. The unusually lengthy interval, for this season, was a direct result of the 2007–2008 Writers Guild of America strike. The season consisted of 22 episodes.

Cast and characters

Main cast 
 Dylan Walsh as Dr. Sean McNamara
 Julian McMahon as Dr. Christian Troy
 John Hensley as Matt McNamara
 Roma Maffia as Liz Cruz
 Kelly Carlson as Kimber Henry
 Joely Richardson as Julia McNamara

Special guest stars

Recurring cast

Episodes

U.S television ratings

Reception 
The fifth season received very positive reviews from critics, holding a 87% fresh rating on Rotten Tomatoes, the highest-rated series of the show on the site. It was praised for its use of humour, with Matthew Gilbert of The Boston Globe writing "The plastic-surgery drama just keeps on spinning smart, tart, funny, tragic, sexy, grotesque tales about vanity and contemporary American life", whilst Charlie McCollum of the San Jose Mercury News wrote, "The shift in setting has resulted in opening episodes that are so wickedly funny and energetic that Nip/Tuck seems like a whole new show – or at least one that has recaptured its past glory." Ryan Murphy received praise for the show's change of location from Miami to Los Angeles, with Mary McNamara of the Los Angeles Times writing "Ten minutes into the season premiere of Nip/Tuck and you have to wonder what those deeply disturbed plastic surgeons were doing wasting four seasons, and all that unexplored sexual tension, in Miami when they so clearly belong in Los Angeles", whilst Brian Lowry wrote for Variety that "A change of venue has helped Nip/Tuck get much of its mojo back." Rick Porter, at Zap2it, wrote "The actors are relishing the change of scenery and all that it brings, and [Ryan] Murphy himself seems more engaged as well." Some criticism was aimed at the show s continued use of sexual content, with Ginia Bellafante of The New York Times writing "For four seasons Nip/Tuck danced around the idea that sex creepily ought to stay within the province of family life's pre-existing perversions; now it is saying so more directly, and with home-baked fruitcake."

References 

Nip/Tuck
2007 American television seasons
2008 American television seasons
2009 American television seasons
Split television seasons